Claudio Moneta is an Italian voice actor who contributes to voicing characters in animation, video games, sitcoms and more. He is very well known for providing the voice of the title character in the Italian language version of the Nickelodeon animated series SpongeBob SquarePants. He is also known for voicing Kakashi Hatake in Naruto and Naruto: Shippuden. The role was temporarily filled by fellow voice actor Gianluca Iacono between 2010 and 2011, due a motorbike incident suffered by Moneta. He was also replaced in Mass Effect 2 because of that accident as well.

He works at Merak Film, Deneb Film and other dubbing studios in Italy. Moneta is also currently the network announcer for the Mediaset owned channel Hiro.

Voice work

Animation
 SpongeBob SquarePants in SpongeBob SquarePants and The SpongeBob SquarePants Movie
 Terrence Thaur and Chumba Bagingi in Monster Allergy
 Keto in Nurse Angel Ririka SOS
 Pegasus in Yu-Gi-Oh! Duel Monsters and Yu-Gi-Oh! Duel Monsters GX
 Wheeler, Czar, and Atticus Rhode in Yu-Gi-Oh! GX
 Bommer in Yu-Gi-Oh! 5D's
 IV in Yu-Gi-Oh! Zexal
 Kakashi Hatake in Naruto and Naruto: Shippuden (1st voice)
 Kakashi Hatake in Naruto the Movie: Ninja Clash in the Land of Snow
 Tucker and other characters in Pokémon
 Goku in Dragon Ball Super
 Boss and Yumetaro Haruna in Hamtaro
 Dr. Mashirit in Dr. Slump (second dub, 1980/86 series)
 Tuxedo Mask in Sailor Moon (Viz Media redub)
 Donquixote Doflamingo, Dracule Mihawk, and other characters in One Piece
 Ryōma in Fūma no Kojirō
 Captain Knuckles in The Marvelous Misadventures of Flapjack
 Mr. Fox in Franklin and Friends 
 Verminious Snaptrap in T.U.F.F. Puppy
 Souga in Legends of the Dark King
 Nick Logan in Roswell Conspiracies: Aliens, Myths and Legends
 Major Glory in Dexter's Laboratory
 Elvis Cridlington in Fireman Sam (2004 series) 
 Defoe in Huntik: Secrets & Seekers
 Jolly in Candy Land: The Great Lollipop Adventure
 Paulie Pretztail in Viva Piñata
 Ed in Best Ed
 Buck in Tomodachi Life: The TV Series
 Sakuragi in Perfect Blue
 Jubei Kibagami in Ninja Scroll
 Anatole in Anatole
 Ryo Asuka in Devilman
 Simon Schulz in Maya & Miguel
 Gargoyle in Nadia: The Secret of Blue Water (2nd dub)
 Tommy Parker in Sarah Lee Jones (3rd voice)
 Zorro in Kaiketsu Zorro
 Takenori Akagi in Slam Dunk
 Kazuma Kuwabara in Yu Yu Hakusho
 Kisuke Urahara in Bleach: Memories of Nobody
 Adon Koborwitz in Berserk
 Diabolik in Saban's Diabolik
 Andy Bogard in Fatal Fury: King of Fighters
 Vincent Blueno in Full Metal Panic! The Second Raid
 Niju in Balto II: Wolf Quest
 Kirby in Balto III: Wings of Change
 Dr. Harvey in The Spooktacular New Adventures of Casper
 The Cat in the Hat in The Cat in the Hat Knows a Lot About That!
 Doctor Doom in Fantastic Four: World's Greatest Heroes
 Dr. Joeb in Mix Master

Live action
 Ted Franklin in iCarly
 Jeff Singer in Unfabulous and in The Hughleys
 Daryl Hughley in The Hughleys
 Barney Stinson in How I Met Your Mother
 Michael Frank in Lüthi und Blanc
 Gilles in Clara Sheller (Season 2)
 Aristide in Premiers Baisers
 Billy Alan Thomas in Ally McBeal
 John Pollock in Missing
 Jackson Greene in USA High
 Stuart Bondek in Spin City
 Julien Lemaître in Élodie Bradford
 Peter Johnson in McLeod's Daughters
 Ram Peters in Nip/Tuck

Video games
 Arthas Menethil in  Warcraft 
 Commander Shepard in  Mass Effect 
 Chris Redfield in Resident Evil: Revelations
 Chris Redfield in Resident Evil 6
 Rikimaru in Tenchu 2: Birth of the Stealth Assassins
 Rikimaru in Tenchu: Wrath of Heaven
 Nomad in Crysis
 Hendrik Schmutz and other characters in Hitman: Blood Money
 Sergeant Major Jefferson and other characters in Act of War: Direct Action
 Michael Corleone in The Godfather II
 Mysterio in Spider-Man 2
 Wolverine in Ultimate Spider-Man
 Shen in League of Legends
 Sir Nevalle and Koraboros in Neverwinter Nights 2
 Jak in Jak II, Jak 3 and Jak X: Combat Racing
 SpongeBob SquarePants in SpongeBob SquarePants: Creature from the Krusty Krab and Nicktoons: Battle for Volcano Island
 Shadow the Hedgehog since Mario & Sonic at the Sochi 2014 Olympic Winter Games (2013)
 Hermit and Malefor the Dark Master in The Legend of Spyro: Dawn of the Dragon
 Viktor Reznov in Call of Duty: Black Ops
 King Riccardo in Assassin's Creed
 Trigger Happy in Skylanders: Spyro's Adventure
 Trigger Happy in Skylanders: Giants
 Thomas Angelo in Mafia: The City of Lost Heaven

References

External links
 

Year of birth missing (living people)
Living people
Male actors from Milan
Italian male voice actors